Rundu Secondary School is a government school in Rundu in the Kavango East region of north-eastern Namibia. It has been founded in 1967 as part of the Odendaal Plan and was at that time the only secondary school in Kavango Region.

Alumni
 Raphael Dinyando (1960–2013), politician and diplomat
 John Mutorwa, member of cabinet

See also
 Education in Namibia
 List of schools in Namibia

References

Schools in Kavango East
Educational institutions established in 1967
1967 establishments in South West Africa